Ihar Hermianchuk (other spellings: Hermyanchuk, Hiermianchuk; Ігар Гермянчук in Belarusian; January 1, 1961 – April 29, 2002) was a famous Belarusian journalist and political activist.

He was a chief editor of Belarus' most popular opposition newspaper in 1990s ("Svaboda", founded again as "Naviny" after being banned by Alexander Lukashenko, and again closed), served as a member of Belarus parliament (12th adjourning of the Supreme Soviet of BSSR), was a vehement supporter of Belarus' independence, a member of Belarusian Popular Front, a founder and an editor-in-chief of the "Kurjer" magazine.

He died from cancer in 2002.

External links
 Ihar Hermianchuk : Belarusian Editor Braves Regime's Tightening Noose (International Herald Tribune)

1961 births
2002 deaths
People from Svietlahorsk District
Belarusian journalists
BPF Party politicians
Members of the Supreme Council of Belarus
Belarusian State University alumni
20th-century journalists